Vilhelm "Vilho" Vauhkonen (6 February 1877 – 1 February 1957) was a Finnish sport shooter who competed in the 1912 Summer Olympics and in the 1920 Summer Olympics. He was born in Pieksämäki and died in Helsinki.

In 1912 he finished fifth with the Finnish team in the team free rifle event and 41st in the 300 metre free rifle, three positions competition. Eight years later he won two bronze medals as member of the Finnish team in the team running deer, double shots event and in the team 300 metre military rifle, prone competition. In the 1920 Summer Olympics he also participated in the following events:

 300 metre military rifle, prone - fourth place
 Team free rifle - fourth place
 Team 300 metre military rifle, standing - seventh place
 Team 600 metre military rifle, prone - eighth place
 Team 300 and 600 metre military rifle, prone - tenth place
 300 metre free rifle, three positions - place unknown

References

External links
profile (name misspelt)

1877 births
1957 deaths
People from Pieksämäki
People from Mikkeli Province (Grand Duchy of Finland)
Finnish male sport shooters
ISSF rifle shooters
Running target shooters
Olympic shooters of Finland
Shooters at the 1912 Summer Olympics
Shooters at the 1920 Summer Olympics
Olympic bronze medalists for Finland
Olympic medalists in shooting
Medalists at the 1920 Summer Olympics
Sportspeople from South Savo